Adel Nefzi (born 16 March 1974 in Béja) is a retired Tunisian football (soccer) player who played as a goalkeeper.

Nefzi originally played for the Olympique de Béja before moving to the US Monastir and then to the Club Africain.
He was called up to the Tunisian national team for the 2006 World Cup as a back-up goalkeeper and did not appear in any matches.

References

1974 births
Living people
Tunisian footballers
2006 FIFA World Cup players
Tunisia international footballers
2008 Africa Cup of Nations players
2010 Africa Cup of Nations players
Association football goalkeepers
Olympique Béja players
US Monastir (football) players
Club Africain players